Lithgow is a hamlet, in the northeastern part of the town of Washington, in Dutchess County, New York, United States.

The hamlet was named for Linlithgow in Scotland.

St. Peter's Episcopal church
Actresses Rachel Kempson, Lynn Redgrave and Natasha Richardson are interred in Lithgow's St. Peter's Episcopal Cemetery.

References

Hamlets in New York (state)
Poughkeepsie–Newburgh–Middletown metropolitan area
Hamlets in Dutchess County, New York